Pertemps may refer to:

 Pertemps Final, a horse race in the United Kingdom
 Birmingham & Solihull R.F.C., formerly the Pertemps Bees
 Swinton Handicap Hurdle, also known as Pertemps Network Handicap Hurdle, a horse race in the United Kingdom